"It's All About You" is a song by Austrian singer-songwriter, artist and actress Fawni. It was released on November 21, 2012. The song was written and produced by Johannes Bürmann, Alexander Gernert, Dan Priddy and Alfred Tuohey. "It's All About You" has since peaked at number one on the iTunes charts in Japan.

Track listing

Remixes
On March 5, 2013 Street Beat Records released a remix compilation of "It's All About You".

1. Original Radio Edit 3:38
2. Original Extended 4:59
3. Mike Rizzo Remix Radio Edit 3:47
4. Mike Rizzo Remix 6:56
5. Dominatorz Remix Radio Edit 3:38
6. Dominatorz Remix 5:21
7. Sjors vam Dimms Remix Radio Edit 3:50
8. Sjors vam Dimms Remix 5:46
9. Al Patrone Remix Radio Edit 3:36
10. Al Patrone Remix 4:14
11. RKRDR Dubstep Remix Radio Edit 3:26
12. RKRDR Dubstep Remix 5:25

Credits and Personnel
Credits adapted from Juno Records.

Fawni - Primary Artist
Johannes Bürmann - Composer, Producer
Alfred Tuohey - Composer, Producer
Alexander Gernert - Composer
Dan Priddy - Composer
Rene Van Verseveld - Vocal Engineer, Mixing
Koen Heldens - Mixing
Jessica Jean - Backing Vocals
Duncan Stanbury - Mastering Engineer
Gil Corber - Executive Producer
Michael Hernandez - Executive Producer

Charts

References

2012 songs